Arrhenatherum elatius, with the common names bulbous oat grass, false oat-grass, tall oat-grass, tall meadow oat, onion couch and tuber oat-grass, is a species of perennial grass, native to Europe, western Asia, and northern Africa.

This bunchgrass is often used as an ornamental grass and is sometimes marketed as "cat grass".

It is native to Europe but can be found elsewhere as an introduced species. It is found especially in prairies, at the side of roads and in uncultivated fields. The bulbous subspecies can be a weed of arable land. It is palatable grass for livestock and is used both as forage (pasture) and fodder (hay and silage).

Description

The leaves are bright green, broad, slightly hairy, and rough. The panicles often remain into winter. The spikelets are oblong or gaping. It flowers from June to September. The roots are yellow.

Two subspecies have been described:
 Arrhenatherum elatius subsp. elatius, the more common variety.
 Arrhenatherum elatius subsp. bulbosum (also called Arrhenatherum tuberosum), onion couch or tuber oat-grass, distinguished by the presence of corms at the base of the stem, by which it propagates. It occurs in vegetated shingle and arable land.

Habitat

Arrhenatherum elatius is a principal species in two UK National Vegetation Classification habitat communities: the very widespread MG1 (Arrhenatherum elatius grassland) and the much rarer MG2 (Arrhenatherum elatius - Filipendula ulmaria tall-herb grassland). This means that it can be found with species such as Dactylis glomerata (also known as cock's-foot and orchard grass), and Filipendula ulmaria (also known as meadow-sweet).

It is found on road verges, along hedges and riverbanks.

It can colonise and stabilise limestone scree, bare calcareous cliffs, maritime shingle and coastal dunes.

References

External links
Jepson Manual Treatment
USDA Plants Profile: Arrhenatherum elatius

Pooideae
Flora of Africa
Flora of Asia
Flora of Europe
Plants described in 1819